Alfred Bigwood (3 August 1857 – 12 September 1940) was an English cricketer. Bigwood was a right-handed batsman who bowled roundarm slow, though which he arm he bowled with is also unknown. He was born at Mortlake, Surrey.

Bigwood made a single first-class appearance for Surrey against Middlesex in 1878 at Lord's. Middlesex won the toss and elected to bat, making 105 all out. Surrey responded in their first-innings by making 84 all out, with Bigwood for 4 runs by Robert Henderson. Middlesex then made 167 all out in their second-innings, leaving Surrey with a target of 189 for victory. However, Surrey could only manage to make 75 all out, with Bigwood ending the innings not out on a single run. Middlesex won the match by 113 runs. This was his only major appearance for Surrey.

He died at Putney, London, on 12 September 1940.

References

External links
Alfred Bigwood at ESPNcricinfo
Alfred Bigwood at CricketArchive

1857 births
1940 deaths
People from Richmond, London
English cricketers
Surrey cricketers